The East Coast State Railway was a railway company operating in India. It was a guaranteed company formed in 1890. It had a brief existence. The southern part of the East Coast State Railway (from Waltair to Vijayawada) was taken over by Madras Railway in 1901. The northern part of the line was merged with Bengal Nagpur Railway in 1902.

During the period 1893 to 1896,  of the East Coast State Railway, from Vijayawada to Cuttack was built and opened to traffic. It included the line to Puri.

References

Railway companies established in 1890
Railway companies disestablished in 1902
1902 disestablishments in India
Indian companies established in 1890
1902 mergers and acquisitions
Transport in Visakhapatnam
Transport in Vijayawada
Transport in Puri
Defunct railway companies of India